Walden's hornbill (Rhabdotorrhinus waldeni) locally called dulungan,  also known as the Visayan wrinkled hornbill, rufous-headed hornbill or writhed-billed hornbill, is a critically endangered species of hornbill living in the rainforests on the islands of Negros and Panay in the Philippines. It is closely related to the writhed hornbill, but can be recognized by the yellow throat and ocular skin in the male, and the blue throat and ocular skin in the female (both throat and ocular skin are deep orange or red in both sexes of the writhed hornbill). Its binomial name commemorates the Scottish ornithologist Viscount Walden.

It is considered one of the Western Visayas Big 5 which includes the Negros bleeding-heart pigeon, Visayan spotted deer, Visayan hornbill and the Visayan warty pig.

Description 
EBird describes the bird as "A large rare bird of lowland and foothill forest on Panay and Negros, although almost extinct on the latter. Mostly black with a cream-colored tail with black terminal band, an orange casque , and a wrinkled lower bill. Male has a rufous head, a yellow pouch, and yellow around the eye. Female has a black neck and head, a smaller bill and  casque , and blue and yellow around the eye and on the chin. The only other hornbill in range is the Visayan hornbill but Writhe-billed is larger, with a pale bill. Voice includes a three-noted throaty chuckle.."

They exhibit sexual dimorphism with the males having a rufous head and yellow facial skin while the females having a black head and blue facial skin and a smaller bill.

Habitat and behaviour 

It inhabits closed-canopy forests, also frequenting logged areas and occasionally isolated trees in clearings at an altitudinal range of 400 to 1,200 m Panay and 350 to 950 m in Negros. It prefers areas abundant fruit-bearing trees for feeding and large trees for nesting. They are known to live in small and noisy flocks. The Walden's hornbills are cavity nesters and use natural or carved-out hollows in tree trunks for its nest. As other hornbills, they reproduce very slowly. As lack of appropriate nesting sites is a problem, nest boxes are being attached to tree trunks in certain reserves.

It is omnivorous, taking some animal matter to its nests and feeding in the canopy on figs and other fruits. It may make local nomadic movements in response to food availability. It nests in large trees.

Conservation status 
This is a critically Endangered species, one of the three critically endangered hornbills including the Sulu hornbill and Helmeted hornbill. It is presumed extinct on Guimaras and now survives only on Negros and Panay The total population has been estimated at less than 160, though recent work from the Central Panay Mountain Range suggests 600-700 pairs may remain there. No recent figures are available for Negros, where it may be functionally extinct. The IUCN Red List estimates the population to be 1,000 to 2,499 mature individuals with the population continuing to decline.

Walden's hornbill reproduce very slowly and thus are unable to survive high hunting pressures coupled with heavy logging of the rainforests. By 2007, Negros and Panay had a 3% and 6% remaining forest cover with most of this being higher elevation forest where this bird does not thrive in. Despite already paltry forest cover, deforestation still continues thanks to both legal and illegal logging, conversion into farmland, mining and road development. As for the case of the Northwest Panay Peninsula Natural Park, a road was built splitting it from the Central Panay Mountain Range and has severely affected the population in the former as these roads allow for easier access by hunters and loggers.

Another huge threat is hunting and capture for the illegal wildlife trade. According to the Philippine Initiative for Environmental Conservation (Philincon), up to 50% of all nests in Central Panay Mountain Range were affected by poachers who would either climb up or cut down the nesting trees to poach the nestlings and the mother.

Due to this high poaching rate, Philincon has devised a nest guarding program where they pay locals US$20 a month to guard hornbill nests and offer an incentive of US$11 for each successful fledge. This program has been effective cutting down the poaching rate to just 5%. Philincon now guards more than 1,000 nest holes which is believed to be at least two-thirds of all nests in the Central Panay Mountain Range. In areas where their large nesting trees have been logged, Philincon installs nest boxes for these hornbills to breed in.

The bird is listed as an EDGE species by the Zoological Society of London where it is ranked as the 50th which uses the  basis of evolutionary distinctness  and endangeredness.

This bird was bred in captivity for the first time by the Mari-it Wildlife and Conservation Park in 2005. As of 2010, they have bred 15 Walden's hornbills. 
In 2019, The Talarak Foundation has also successfully bred them in captivity in their Negros facility after nine years of attempts.

Further conservation actions proposed are: more funding should be allocated primarily to in situ protection along the lines of PhilCon's guarding scheme; conduct further surveys, particularly on Panay to identify important sites and use this data to decide further actions; continue community awareness programmes to reduce hunting and illegal logging on both Negros and Panay; work in partnership at the government level to strengthen protected area legislation and improve the network in the long term; and support the development of captive breeding and reintroduction programmes.

References

ARKive - images and movies of the Walden's hornbill (Aceros waldeni)

Rhabdotorrhinus
Birds of Negros Island
Birds of Panay
Critically endangered biota of Asia
Birds described in 1877
Taxa named by Richard Bowdler Sharpe